National Tertiary Route 738, or just Route 738 (or ) is a National Road Route of Costa Rica, located in the Alajuela province.

Description
In Alajuela province the route covers San Carlos canton (La Tigra district).

References

Highways in Costa Rica